Handball competitions at the Guadalajara 2011 Pan American Games was held from October 15 to 24 at the San Rafael Gymnasium. Medals were awarded for both men's and women's team events. Each NOC is permitted to enter one men's team and one women's team in the handball competitions. Each team will consist of 15 athletes. The winner of each event qualified to compete at the 2012 Summer Olympics in London, Great Britain.

Medal summary

Medal count

Events

Qualification
An NOC may enter up to one men's team with 15 players and up to one women's team with 15 players. Mexico, as the host country qualify automatically, as do the seven other countries through regional tournaments.

Italicized teams qualified via the last chance tournaments.

Handball – Men

Handball – Women

Schedule
The competition was spread out across nine days, with the men and women competing on alternating dates.

References

 
2011
International handball competitions hosted by Mexico